Ahmadshah bin Abdullah (Jawi: أحمد شاه عبدﷲ; born 9 December 1946) is a retired Malaysian civil servant who served as Yang di-Pertua Negeri (Governor) of the state of Sabah from 2003 to 2010. He is currently a Pro-Chancellor of MARA University of Technology.

Education 
Ahmadshah began his education at Government Primary School Darau, Menggatal in 1952 and ended his secondary school session on 1967 at La Salle Secondary School, Tanjung Aru, Kota Kinabalu. He received a Diploma in Development Administration from South Devon College in the United Kingdom and Bachelor of Science (Political Science) from Indiana State University in the United States.

Career 
He started his career as a Custom Officer at Royal Custom and Excise Department, Kota Kinabalu on 1 March 1968.  He was appointed as Executive Officer (Rural) and was moved to Beaufort District Office as Assistant District Officer (Rural) on 10 November 1969. He was seconded to the National Paddy and Rice Board as Chief Officer from April 1979 until July 1983.

He also worked as Secretary of State Public Service Commission (1983), Dakwah Officer of Sabah Islamic Affairs Council (October 1986 to January 1988), Secretary of Islamic Council of Sabah (January 1988 to June 1994), Secretary of Internal Affairs and Research Office (1994 to 1995) and Director of State Public Service Department (December 1995 to March 1998). He served as Deputy State Secretary (Administration) from 21 March 1998 to 8 December 2002.

On 1 January 2003, he was sworn in as the ninth Yang di-Pertua Negeri of Sabah. He served two full terms and stepped down on 31 December 2010.

Personal life 
He is married to Hajah Dayang Masuyah binti Awang Japar and they have three sons and a daughter.

Honours

Honours of Malaysia 
 :
 Grand Commander of the Order of the Defender of the Realm (SMN) – Tun (2003)
 :
  Commander of the Order of Kinabalu (PGDK) - Datuk (1993)
 Grand Commander of the Order of Kinabalu (SPDK) – Datuk Seri Panglima (2004)
 :
  Member of the Supreme Order of Sri Mahawangsa (DMK) – Dato' Seri Utama (2008)

References 

Yang di-Pertua Negeri of Sabah
People from Sabah
1946 births
Living people
Bajau people
Malaysian Muslims
United Malays National Organisation politicians
Indiana State University alumni
Grand Commanders of the Order of the Defender of the Realm
Commanders of the Order of Kinabalu